Major General Giri Prasad Burathoki was a Gurkha officer and Nepalese politician. He was born in 1898 at Bharse, Gulmi District, Nepal. He left his village at a young age to join the British army in India and was involved in World War I and World War II. He showed great bravery and distinguished service during his military career with the British for which he was conferred the title of "Sardar Bahadur" and was awarded the Order of British Empire, Order of British India, Military Cross and many other medals. He retired as an "Honorary Captain" of the British Indian Army.

On his return home, he was made the District Commissioner of Gulmi District from 1951 to 1956. Thereafter, he was elected as a Member of Parliament from Gulmi District in 1959 and also served the first Speaker of the House. The House was dissolved by King Mahendra, but he was later nominated to the National Panchayat and made an Assistant Minister. He won successive elections and served as the first Defense Minister of Nepal for nearly a decade. For his service to the nation, he was conferred the medals of the Order of Tri Shakti Patta Class I and Order of Gorkha Dakshina Bahu Class I. He was also conferred the title of Honorary Major General of the Nepal Army.

He died in 1981. His elder son, late Colonel Shri Prasad Burathoki also joined the British Indian Army and later the Indian Army and after his retirement served as a Minister of State of Nepal Government. His younger son, Major General Nara Bahadur Burathoki, who was the first Magar Major General of Nepalese Army after the fall of the Rana dynasty, retired from the Nepal Army after a long distinguished service.

References 

1898 births
1981 deaths
People from Gulmi District
Gurkhas
Nepalese generals
Government ministers of Nepal
Members of the Order of the British Empire
Members of the Order of Gorkha Dakshina Bahu, First Class
Recipients of the Military Cross
Members of the Order of Tri Shakti Patta, First Class
Members of the Rastriya Panchayat
Nepal MPs 1959–1960
Nepalese expatriates in India